The High Point Schools are a group of private special education elementary and adolescent schools located on a  campus in the Morganville section of Marlboro Township, in Monmouth County, New Jersey, United States. The schools provide educational and therapeutic services for students ages 5 – 21 who have emotional, behavioral and learning difficulties. The schools are a division of CPC Behavioral Healthcare.

For the 1993-94 school year, High Point Elementary School was awarded the National Blue Ribbon Award of Excellence from the United States Department of Education, the highest honor that an American school can achieve.

References

External links
High Point Schools
National Center for Education Statistics data for the High Point Schools

Marlboro Township, New Jersey
Private elementary schools in New Jersey
Private high schools in Monmouth County, New Jersey
Private middle schools in New Jersey